Liasu Braimoh (born 15 August 1965) is a Nigerian boxer. He competed in the men's light welterweight event at the 1988 Summer Olympics.

References

1965 births
Living people
Nigerian male boxers
Olympic boxers of Nigeria
Boxers at the 1988 Summer Olympics
Place of birth missing (living people)
Light-welterweight boxers